The NSW League One Men is an Australian semi-professional association football league comprising teams from New South Wales. The league sits at Level 2 on the New South Wales league system, behind the National Premier Leagues NSW, (Level 3 of the overall Australian league system). The competition is administered by Football NSW, the governing body of the sport in the southern region of the state (the northern region governed by Northern NSW Football). Prior to 2013, the league was formerly known as the "NSW Super League" and in 2022 seasons onwards, the league name change again from "National Premier League 2 NSW" to "Football NSW League One".

History
Following a review by the FFA of state league competitions in Australia, it was announced that they would nationalise the competitions under the one national banner, the National Premier Leagues from the 2013 seasons onwards. This saw the first and second-tier leagues of the state renamed under the banner.

The inaugural NSW NPL2 winners in 2013 were St George FC.

Format
The regular season consists of 26 rounds with each team playing each other twice-home and away.  Following the regular season the top six teams on the table play in a finals series using the following format:
 First week – preliminary semi-final – 2nd vs 3rd + elimination semi-final – 4th vs 5th
 Second week – major semi-final – 1st vs winner PSF + minor semi-final – loser PSF vs winner ESF
 Third week – preliminary final – loser of MJF vs winner of MNS
 Final week – grand final – winner of MJF vs winner of PF

Promotion/relegation

Up to the 2019 season, promotion and relegation was based on the Club Championship table (for the performances of the Seniors, U20 and U18 teams). Due to a restructure of men's and boys' competitions for the 2020 season, 2019 was the last season that the Club Championship determined the teams for promotion and relegation.

Clubs
The following 16 clubs competed in the NSW League One Men during the 2023 season.

Seasons

 Source: www.socceraust.co.uk

Honours

Notes

References

External links
 Football NSW League One Official

2
Third level football leagues in Asia